The Rouillon is a small river in southern Île-de-France (France), left tributary of the Yvette, which is a tributary of the Orge. Its source is in Villejust, north of Longjumeau, in the Essonne department.

The Rouillon crosses the following départements and towns:
Essonne: Villejust, Saulx-les-Chartreux, Ballainvilliers, Longjumeau.

Tributaries
 le ruisseau blanc

Special places
A bridge, call le pont des Templiers (templars bridge), considering as the older bridge in Essonne department, is nearby Balizy, an area of Longjumeau. It was built in the 13th century.

References

Rivers of France
Rivers of Essonne
Rivers of Île-de-France